River is a six-part British television drama series, created and written by Abi Morgan and starring Stellan Skarsgård and Nicola Walker. It premiered on BBC One on 13 October 2015 and internationally on Netflix on 18 November 2015. The series is a police procedural. Detective Inspector John River is suffering from guilt over a recent loss.

Cast
Stellan Skarsgård John River, Metropolitan Police Service
Nicola Walkerthe late  Jackie "Stevie" Stevenson
Adeel Akhtar Ira King
Georgina RichRosa Fallows, police psychologist
Sorcha CusackBridie Stevenson
Owen Teale Marcus McDonald
Turlough ConveryFrankie Stevenson
Eddie MarsanThomas Neill Cream, the Lambeth Poisoner
Lesley Manville Chrissie Read
Michael Maloney Tom Read
 Jim Norton Michael Bennigan
Shannon TarbetErin Fielding
Josef AltinChristopher Riley

Production
The series was commissioned by Charlotte Moore and Ben Stephenson. The executive producers are Jane Featherstone, Manda Levin, Abi Morgan and Lucy Richer. Filming began in London in October 2014. The series was made by Kudos and will be distributed globally by Shine International.

Vicki Power of the Daily Express reported Skarsgård saying of his role as DI River, "There's not much research you can do because his condition doesn't really exist as we know it. It's a combination of problems, because he's not like people who hear voices – they're usually schizophrenic and lack empathy and he does not. But it doesn't make it less truthful. What attracted me to the script is that it didn't look like any other script I've ever read." Power added, "The series is the brainchild of Emmy-winner Abi Morgan, who wrote The Hour and The Iron Lady. Abi freely admits she nicked the idea from the late Anthony Minghella, who directed the 1990 fantasy film Truly, Madly, Deeply, in which a grieving woman's (Juliet Stevenson) dead boyfriend appears to come back to life".

Describing how she addressed the subject of living with voices in your head, as River does, Morgan told the BBC, "I know from myself, I talk out loud. I've got children and they say to me 'mummy, you talk to yourself all the time'. I realised how much I do have other people in my head and what a comfort they are to me. It's not just about those who experience voices through mental health, it's the voices we carry from our past, our future or experiences, that we manifest and I hope that's something that an audience will identify with".

Talking about recording the scenes involving manifests, Skarsgård said: "How we practically do it is we usually shoot the scene first with the actor who plays the manifest and then we shoot the same scene exactly the same way but without anybody there. It looks fantastic, because you walk around, you gesture and talk to somebody that isn't there and it's quite interesting visually. To me, I'm the kind of actor who doesn't want to act towards a mark beside the camera; I want the real actor to be there, and I feed so much off the other actors. So it's very unnatural to me to do it, but since we always do the scene with the actor first I have a very clear memory and then we do it with the real actor saying the lines, so I still get a response and it becomes more like playing a game of ping pong".

The series used the song I Love to Love (But My Baby Loves to Dance) at the start and end of the first episode and at the end of the last episode.

Locations
Filming took place across at least eight London Boroughs - Lambeth, Islington, Camden, Hackney, Southwark, Redbridge, Newham, Tower Hamlets and Lewisham.

Notable roads, buildings and landmarks include Clerkenwell Road in Islington, Southwark Park, Globe Theatre and Millennium Bridge in Southwark, and Stratford International in Newham.

Episodes

Critical reception
After the first episode, Sam Wollaston wrote in The Guardian: "It's more than just crime drama – it's about personal tragedy, demons; it's a study of loss and grief (which it shares with the greatest Nordic noir of them all: the first series of The Killing). It's also a study of that – killing – and why people do it. And why they did it – Mr Cream brings a historical perspective to it. And Abi Morgan, the creator of the series, brings a characteristic humanness to it all; it's as much about who the people are as about what they do to each other. Good enough for me."

The first episode also impressed the Daily Telegraphs Tim Martin, who gave it a full five stars in his review and called it "superlatively creepy TV" and "a dense and thoughtful police procedural". Martin found that: "Much of the credit also belongs to Skarsgård […] His performance here was a revelation, switching in seconds from remoteness to fury, from twinkling avuncularity to withering scorn – and the emotional punch at the end of this episode, when River finally admitted the extent of his psychological distress, was the most moving thing I've seen on television for some time. Then he went home to find a dead man sitting on his bed. Personally, I can't wait for next week."

Daisy Wyatt, in The Independent, found the series "well-written and shot beautifully, but the criminal investigation is not the crux of the drama. River's mind becomes the crime scene as he struggles with psychotic hallucinations – or 'manifests' as he calls them – of past victims, namely colleague Detective Jackie 'Stevie' Stevenson, played by Walker."

Reviewing Episode Two for The Daily Telegraph, Gerard O'Donovan gave it 4 out of 5 stars, writing: "Two episodes in, River (BBC Two) is proving a most intriguing piece of television. It takes the shape – and tropes – of a standard police drama yet appears to be expanding, flowing even, into something quite different" and called Skarsgård "extraordinarily expressive." O'Donovan concluded that, "River – so far at least […] offers a richer emotional landscape than most crime drama on TV."

The final episode earned a five-star review from The Daily Telegraphs Michael Hogan, who noted, "Skarsgård delivered a powerhouse performance: sad and soulful in one scene, sardonically spiky and manically energetic in the next." Hogan praised the production, writing: "This series was beautifully written by Abi Morgan, stylishly directed, and most of all, superbly acted." He concluded by saying, "I'm torn between wanting River to get recommissioned […] and wanting this series to stand alone as six near-perfect episodes. Creepy yet ultimately uplifting, River stands alongside London Spy, Humans and Wolf Hall as one of the year's best home-grown TV dramas."

For her role as DCI Chrissie Read, Lesley Manville earned a nomination for the 2016 BAFTA TV Award for Best Supporting Actress.

See also
 Raines

References

Further reading
  (Interview with Abi Morgan about the show)

External links

River on Netflix

 

2015 British television series debuts
2015 British television series endings
BBC television dramas
Paranormal television
Ghosts in television
Television about mental health
Television shows set in London
English-language television shows